Giuseppe Bartolomeo Chiari (10 March 1654 – 8 September 1727), also known simply as Giuseppe Chiari, was an Italian painter of the late-Baroque period, active mostly in Rome.

Biography
Born in Rome, he was one of the main assistants, along with Giuseppe Passeri and Andrea Procaccini, in the studio of an elder Carlo Maratta. His father had opposed the career, but his mother, on the recommendation of a painter named Carlo Antonio Gagliani.

By the age of 22, he had frescoed the lateral lunettes (Birth of Virgin and Adoration of Magi) of the Marchionni chapel in the church of Santa Maria del Suffragio. He also painted the ceiling of a chapel in Santa Maria in Cosmedin.
He frescoed rooms in the Palazzo Barberini to allegorical sketches of Bellori of Aurora leading Apollo and chariot with time and seasons with extensive interweaving of heraldic symbols, including bees (symbol of Barberini); two-headed eagle alighting on globe with blue and white stripes (symbol of the family of Vittorio Ottoboni; crossed keys under baldachin (symbol of Pope Alexander VIII); a golden fleece (symbol of award given to Taddeo Barberini; a column (symbol of the Colonna family); sun and laurels (symbols of Urban VIII), and post (symbols of the Pignatelli family).

He also frescoed the Palaces Colonna and Spada with scenes based on Ovid's Metamorphoses. He additionally frescoed the Villa di Marchese Torri outside of Porta San Pancrazio in collaboration with landscape artist Jan van Bloemen; as well as the church of San Silvestro in Capite with Madonna and child with Saint Anthony performing miracles and Pope Stephen I destroying temple of Mars with lightning (1696) for Santa Maria del Suffragio (where he completed Niccolò Berrettoni's fresco). He also painted for Santa Maria in Posterola, Santa Maria di Loreto, San Salvatore in Lauro, and an Assumption for Santa Maria del Montesanto. For Basilica di San Clemente, he painted a St Clement in Glory for pope Clement XI. He also prepared the cartoons for the mosaics in the lateral nave of the Basilica of Saint Peter’s and San Giovanni Laterano with the oval of Prophet Obdiah listening to trumpet of Judgement Day. He also painted a Vision of St John in the chapel of the Presentazione for the Duomo di Urbino.

He was a teacher of William Kent, Paolo Anesi, and Giovanni Andrea Lazzarini. His studio is described as highly frequented by French artists. He became director or principe of the Accademia di San Luca (1723–25).

Partial anthology of works in Rome

Adoration by Magi & Birth of Mary, 3rd chapel on right of Santa Maria del Suffragio.
Apotheosis of Marcantonio II Colonna, ceiling fresco of Sala delle Colonne Belliche of Palazzo Colonna.
Solar Carriage, Galleria Nazionale d'Arte Antica.
Decoration of ceiling in piano nobile of Palazzo De Carolis.
Decoration of lunettes in 2nd chapel on right in Sant'Ignazio.
Judith and head of Holoferne and Allegories of Clement XI papacy''', Museo di Roma in Palazzo Braschi.Glory of the Virgin, ceiling frescoes of 3rd chapel on left in Santa Maria del Montesanto.Glory of Angels, Chapel of Founders, Sant'Andrea al Quirinale.Glory of San Clemente, ceiling frescoes of upper basilica of San Clemente.Bacchus & Ariadne, Palazzo Spada.Madonna, child, & Saints Anthony of Padua & Stefano I. San Silvestro in Capite.Miracles of St. Francesco di Paola, wall and ceiling frescoes on 2nd chapel to right of San Francesco di PaolaProfeta Abdia, painted in oval over aedicule of nave in Basilica di San GiovanniSan Francesco surrounded by Angels, Santi Apostoli, Rome.Holy Family and young John the Baptist, Santa Maria alle Grazie delle Fornaci.Saints Peter of Alcantara and Pasquale Baylon, San Francesco a Ripa.Tullia driving her Chariot over her FatherReferences

SourcesGiuseppe Bartolomeo Chiari, by Bernhard Kerber; Renate Franciscono(1968) The Art Bulletin p75-86.
 Getty Museum site
Romecity entry

 External links 

 The Rest on the Flight into Egypt by'' Giuseppe Bartolomeo Chiari, Museum & Gallery collection in Greenville, SC

1654 births
1727 deaths
17th-century Italian painters
Italian male painters
18th-century Italian painters
Italian Baroque painters
Pupils of Carlo Maratta
18th-century Italian male artists